Duke Ludwig Wilhelm Karl Norbert Theodor Johann in Bavaria (17 January 1884 – 5 November 1968) was a member of the Kingdom of Bavaria's ruling dynasty, the House of Wittelsbach. From 1909 he was the head of the Wittelsbachs' cadet branch, the Dukes in Bavaria, heirs of the Counts Palatine of Birkenfeld-Gelnhausen.

Life 
Ludwig Wilhelm was born at Schloss Tegernsee, the eldest son of Duke Karl Theodor in Bavaria and his second wife Infanta Maria Josepha of Portugal.

By royal command of King Leopold II, he received the Grand Cordon of Leopold as a sister's wedding gift in 1900. However the Prince was only 14 years old and today remains one of the youngest Grand Cordons in Belgian History.

He married Princess Eleonore Anna Lucie zu Sayn-Wittgenstein-Berleburg, widow of Victor Fürst (Prince) von Schönburg (1882 – killed at Rheims, 14 September 1914) and daughter of Prince Franz zu Sayn-Wittgenstein-Berleburg and Countess Julia Cavalcanti d'Albuquerque de Villeneuve, on 19 March 1917 in Kreuth.  They had no children.

After the death of his wife on 20 February 1965, he adopted the grandson of his sister Marie Gabrielle, Max Emanuel.

Ludwig Wilhelm died on 5 November 1968 in Wildbad Kreuth.

Ancestry

References

House of Wittelsbach
1884 births
1968 deaths
Members of the Bavarian Reichsrat
Dukes in Bavaria
People from Miesbach (district)